They Call Me Mr. Kane is the third studio album by American rapper Kokane. It was released on November 16, 1999 via Eureka Records. The record featured guest appearances from Bad Azz, Big Tray Deee, C-Bo, Mr. Short Khop, Spice 1, Too $hort, Pomona City Rydaz, and Natural Disasters. Audio production of the album was handled by DJ Battlecat and DJ Silk.

Track listing 

Sample credits
"Sprinkle With Game" contains elements from "Can I" by One Way (1982)

Personnel

Jerry B. Long, Jr. - main artist
Kevin Gilliam - producer (tracks 1-2, 8-10)
Russell Brown - producer (tracks 3-7)
Laness Daniel - mixing, executive producer
Robert Vosgien - mastering
Lionel Hunt - featured artist (track 1)
Precious Raquel King - featured artist (track 1)
Robert Lee Green, Jr. - featured artist (track 2)
Tracy Lamar Davis - featured artist (track 3)
Todd Anthony Shaw - featured artist (track 6)
Jamarr Antonio Stamps - featured artist (track 7)
Shawn “Cowboy” Thomas - featured artist (track 10)
Natural Disasters - featured artists (track 5)
Pomona City Rydaz - featured artists (track 8)

References

External links 
They Call Me Mr. Kane at MusicBrainz

1999 albums
Kokane albums
Albums produced by Battlecat (producer)